Tovuz is a city and the capital of the Tovuz District of Azerbaijan. It's famous for its wine-making, and it also has several archaeological sites. Tovuz region was established on August 8, 1930. The district is one of the largest agricultural districts in the country, its area is 1942 sq. km, and its population is 177.2 thousand people as of 01.01.2020.

Etymology 
Tovuz means The abode of the Oghuz Turks in the Azerbaijani language, and comes from Turkic language. The city itself, however, takes its name from an Oghuz tribe.

Territory 
There are 2 cities (Tovuz and Govlar) and 102 villages in Tovuz region. There are 43 administrative territorial districts and 41 municipalities in the region.

Economy 
The economy of Tovuz is partially agricultural, partially tourist-based, with some industries in operation.

Winemaking 
The history of wine production in Tovuz seems to have begun before the 7th century and according to the archaeological findings, which included vessels for wine storage and remains of tartaric acid, proves that the winemaking was apparent in the Tovuz and Ganja region during early stages of social development.

The winemaking industry was boosted in the city after German settlement.  Led by Christopher Froer and Christian Gummel, many vineyards were established. Furthermore, Tovuz became famous for producing brandy, under the name cognac, which supplied the entire Russian market.

In addition to German influence in the Caucasus, Russia also played a significant role in the development of winemaking, especially in the Tovuz region in the 19th century. Russian influence was also formative in the development and production of aromatic wines.

Climate 
There are three climatic zones in the region:

     1. Dry subtropical climate. This climatic area covers the Kura river valley. It is characterized by mild winters and hot summers.

    2. Moderate hot dry climate. This climate covers the plain part of the region and the areas with an elevation of up to 1000 meters. Winters are mild and summers are slightly hot.

    3. Mild cold, forest climate. This climatic zone covers the mountainous part with an elevation of 1000 to 2000 meters. Summer is cool and winter is slightly frosty. The climate of Tovuz region is influenced by air masses from the South Caucasus (Transcaucasia) plateau, the Atlantic Ocean, the Arctic and Central Asia.

Sports
The city has one professional football team competing in the top-flight of Azerbaijani football - Turan Tovuz, currently playing in the Azerbaijan Premier League.

Archaeology
The ancient village of Goytepe (Göy Tepe) is one of the largest archaeological monuments in Ganja – Gazakh region. It is located to the right of the Kura river, 10 km east of Tovuz. The site extends over 2ha, at a maximum elevation of c. 420 m.

Starting in 2008, “Tovuz Archaeological expedition” is conducting new archaeological investigations at Goytepe, and also at the Mentesh tepe ancient settlement nearby. This is a joint investigation of archaeologists from Azerbaijan, Japan and France.

In this same area of Azerbaijan are also located the ancient sites of Shomu Tepe, Soyuq Bulaq, and Boyuk Kesik. Shulaveris Gora is just across the border in Georgia.

Sister cities
  Cognac, France (since 2015)

Gallery

References

External links
 
 World Gazetteer: Azerbaijan – World-Gazetteer.com
 Tovuz, the land of antiquity and natural beauty. washingtontimes.com

Populated places in Tovuz District